Eudonia fogoalis is a moth in the family Crambidae. It was described by Georg Derra in 2008. It is found on the island of Fogo, Cape Verde.

References

Eudonia
Moths of Cape Verde
Fauna of Fogo, Cape Verde
Moths described in 2008